The 1955 British Kangchenjunga expedition succeeded in climbing the  Kangchenjunga, the third highest mountain in the world, for the first time. The expedition complied with a request from the Sikkim authorities that the summit should not be trodden on so the climbers deliberately stopped about five feet below the summit. George Band and Joe Brown reached the top on 25 May 1955, and they were followed the next day by Norman Hardie and Tony Streather. The expedition was led by Charles Evans who had been deputy leader on the 1953 British Mount Everest expedition.

The expedition trekked from Darjeeling in India along the border with Sikkim and then through Nepal to the Yalung Valley. They unsuccessfully attempted a climbing route reconnoitred by a team led by John Kempe the year before but succeeded along a different route up the Yalung Face, one that Aleister Crowley's 1905 Kanchenjunga expedition had first attempted.

In mountaineering circles at the time and more recently, the climb is sometimes regarded as a greater achievement than the ascent of Mount Everest two years earlier.

Background

Political

Following the ascent of Everest in 1953 and K2 in 1954, Kangchenjunga, the third highest mountain in the world, had become the highest unclimbed mountain. The mountain is on the border between Nepal and Sikkim and can be approached from either side. It is the most widely visible of the 8000-metre peaks and can be well seen from Darjeeling in West Bengal. In 1955 Sikkim had a degree of control over its internal affairs and would not allow any attempt to climb the mountain. However, from 1950 Nepal had been permitting a few mountaineering expeditions, particularly enabling reconnaissance of routes to Everest, and were willing to allow an attempt on Kangchenjunga from the west.

Exploration

Kangchenjunga is a highly active mountain with avalanches constantly streaming down its sides. It is somewhat distanced from the line of the Himalayas and, because it is near where the monsoon approaches from the Bay of Bengal, the monsoon season persists longer than for any other of the eight-thousanders.

Throughout the 20th century and from even before that time, the mountain had been explored by many teams and the two routes attempted in 1955 – up the Yalung Face of the mountain from the Yalung glacier – had been reconnoitred in 1905 by a Swiss team led by Jules Jacot-Guillarmod with Aleister Crowley as climbing leader and by John Kempe in 1954. Kempe's report led to the Alpine Club agreeing to sponsor a reconnaissance effort which might also attempt to reach the summit.

Team members
The members of the team were led by Charles Evans (36 years of age at the time of the climb), who had been deputy leader on the 1953 British Mount Everest expedition. The rest of the team included:
 Norman Hardie (30 years), a New Zealander, was deputy leader and had explored the Barun Valley with Edmund Hillary in 1954.
 George Band (26 years), had been on the 1953 Mount Everest expedition and was responsible for food.
 Joe Brown (24 years), was an outstanding rock climber in Britain and the Alps.
 John Clegg (29 years) was the expedition doctor and an Alpine climber.
 John Jackson (34 years), with considerable Himalayan experience, had been on the 1954 Kangchenjunga reconnaissance expedition.
 Tom McKinnon (42 years), was the expedition photographer with considerable Himalayan experience.
 Neil Mather (28 years) was an ice and snow climber in the Alps.
 Tony Streather (29 years), with broad mountaineering experience including on the 1953 American Karakoram expedition, was responsible for porters and had knowledge of Hindustani.
 Dawa Tensing (about 45 years), was sirdar (chief Sherpa). He had been Evans' personal Sherpa on the 1952 Cho Oyu and 1953 Everest expeditions where he had twice reached the South Col.
 Annullu, deputy sirdar, had also been at the South Col in 1953. There were about 30 Sherpas from Solu Khumbu and 300 porters from Darjeeling.

Equipment
Considerable advances had been made in equipment in preparation for the 1953 Everest expedition and so changes for 1955 were less substantial. Rather than taking vacuum packed high-altitude food they took packs for ten-man-days to be shared out so individual tastes could be better accommodated.

Their high-altitude boots were of a neater design which allowed for canvas overboots and crampons on top of the whole lot. Their oxygen equipment was improved in design. The climbers used supplemental oxygen above Camp 3 and the Sherpas above Camp 5. They took two closed-circuit sets, largely for experimental purposes but they relied on open-circuit which were also found to be generally more satisfactory. A set weighed only 80% of the Everest design. The flow valves were made of rubber to avoid problems of blockage by ice but unfortunately, when the rubber became cold and rigid overnight, the valves would leak badly when turned on in the morning. Early starts were sometimes delayed while the equipment was being warmed up. Another problem was that the climbers lost weight during the climb so that their face masks no longer fitted well and this also caused a waste of gas. Worse, the leak could cause their goggles to mist up – removing these, even just to wipe them, risked becoming snowblind. In all,  of supplies had to be carried from Darjeeling.

Expedition

Departure for Darjeeling
Shortly before they sailed from Liverpool on 12 February 1955 they were told that for spiritual reasons the Sikkim government objected to any attempt at all to climb the mountain, even from Nepal, so before they departed Darjeeling Evans went to Gangtok to visit the Dewan (prime minister) with whom he reached a compromise that the expedition could go ahead provided that once they were sure of being able to reach the summit they would go no higher and they would not desecrate the vicinity of the summit.

March-in and first base camp 

They left Darjeeling on 14 March for the  journey to Mane Bhanjyang transporting their baggage in a convoy of dilapidated trucks. At Phalut they turned west to enter the jungles of Nepal. After Chyangthapu they headed north again through intensively cultivated terraced land. At Khebang (now Khewang)  there was a long climb up to the pass leading to the Yalung valley where there was again jungle, which eventually turned into the gravel outwash of the Yalung glacier. Yalung Camp was established as a substantial camp from where to acclimatise by climbing many nearby peaks. Accurate theodolite measurements were taken of features in the vicinity of Kangchenjunga's Yalung, or southwest, face. A supply chain for food for the Sherpas – tsampa and atta – was organised from Ghunsa village two days carry away. Also, plans were made for the future moving of goods from Yalung to a base camp much higher up the glacier.

The trek to Yalung Camp had taken 10 days and when they left after their acclimatisation period there was a four-day trek up the glacier to a base camp to be established at the foot of Kempe's Buttress, at the foot of the route suggested by the reconnaissance of the year before. Because the porters had been paid off the trek to base camp had to be done repeatedly in very poor weather. The left bank (southeastern side) of the glacier was subject to continual avalanches from Talung so they took the right bank even though the ice was very broken there.

Attempt via Kempe's Buttress 
From the top of the Buttress, however, Band and Hardie took two days trying to get onto the icefall itself. Evans and Jackson joined the effort and although they then managed to get onto the icefall they could make no further progress. Band, who had climbed Everest's Khumbu Icefall,  wrote:
 Fortunately, Hardie spotted a small glacier descending the Western Buttress – the wall on the far side of the glacier – and the small glacier reached down from a location they called the "Hump" to a point on the icefall roughly level with their vantage point. So, they decided to abandon their present attempt and try all over again hoping to reach the western side of the icefall. The intention was to climb up to the Hump along the western side of the Western Buttress and to achieve this involved moving base camp.

Attempt from Pache's grave

As it happens the location of the second base camp was where, on Crowley's 1905 expedition, Alexis Pache and three porters were laid to rest after they had been killed in an avalanche. The wooden cross and gravestone still stood there. Kempe's team had investigated the area the previous year but considered it would tend to lead towards the subsidiary peak Kangchenjunga West leaving a difficult traverse to the main summit. Also, the route was vulnerable to avalanches.

Evans' plan was to climb to the Hump and then drop down to the Lower Icefall. They would then attempt the short climb to the top of the Lower Icefall to reach a plateau at the foot of the Upper Icefall. The rocks of the Sickle were the first outcrop to be reached after the Hump.

Lower and upper icefall

By 26 April Band and Hardie had pitched Camp 1 two-thirds of the way up the very steep snow slopes on the western side of the Western Buttress. They struggled up the edge of the icefall to reach the spacious avalanche-free plateau between the Upper and Lower Icefall. The Plateau was an excellent location for Camp 2 which was soon established by Evans and Brown. For three weeks without a single day being missed, supplies were ferried between Base Camp and Camp 2, stopping overnight at Camp 1 on the way up.

On 29 April Evans and Brown were close to the eventual site of Camp 3 but that night a storm hit. When they tried to descend to Camp 1 the depth of snow and the severe avalanches meant they had to go back to Camp 2 where there was a shortage of food.

Upper camps

Streather, Mather and their Sherpas started stocking Camp 4 while the rest of the climbers returned to recuperate at Base Camp. When there, Evans announced the detailed plans for the next few days – the reconnaissance had turned into a bid for the summit. Jackson, McKinnon and their
Sherpas would stock Camp 5. Brown and Band, the first summit pair, supported by Evans, Mather and four Sherpas would follow a day later. The supporting climbers would establish Camp 6 as near to the top of the Gangway as possible. Hardie and Streather would be a second assault team, supported by two Sherpas and moving up a day later still.

Things did not get off to a good start. Streather became snowblind and was unable to get above Camp 4 and many of the supplies had to be dumped below Camp 5. Jackson and McKinnon were unable to descend to Camp 3 so had to stay at Camp 4 with Brown and Band. That night a blizzard developed and it seemed the monsoon might be imminent. However, Jackson and McKinnon were able to descend to Camp 3. On the third day the storm conditions abated so Evans, Mather, Brown, Band and three Sherpas set off for Camp 5 only to find an avalanche had swept away many of the supplies that had been dumped there. After a day of unscheduled rest at Camp 5 they then made good progress but when they reached a rocky outcrop at the planned height for Camp 6, there was nowhere at all suitable. Despite the conditions they had an evening meal of asparagus soup, lambs' tongues and drinking chocolate. Band and Brown remained at Camp 6 for the night of 24 May, wearing all their clothes, including boots, inside their sleeping bags and using a low flow of supplemental oxygen.

Summit attempts

25 May 1955 – Brown and Band
At 05:00 a fine day beckoned and by 08:15 Brown and Band were ready to set off up the Gangway where they found very good snow conditions. Going to the top of the Gangway would have led to an awkward lengthy route along the west ridge to the summit so their plan was to veer to the right off the Gangway onto the southwest face and so reach the ridge quite close to the summit. A suitable line had been spotted from below but it was unclear where to actually turn off the Gangway. In the event they turned too soon and had to backtrack, so wasting 1½ hours. The next stage involved rock climbing and then there was a 60° snow slope. They could only afford to use a low rate of oxygen (two litres a minute each) and this seemed to sustain Brown better than Band so they stopped alternating the lead climbing and Brown stayed going first.

They took a brief rest and a snack until 14:00 when they had two hours of oxygen left – they had to reach the summit by 15:00 to avoid an emergency bivouac on the way down. It was 14:45 on 25 May 1955. Even though this was the first ascent of the mountain, as agreed they did not go up onto the summit itself.

They started the descent, discarding their oxygen sets when they were empty after one hour. As it got dark they reached their tent to be greeted by Hardie and Streather who had arrived there to make a second attempt if the first had failed. Band and Brown thought it was too dangerous to continue straight down to Camp 5 so that night four men had to survive in the small two-man tent that jutted out over the edge of the narrow ledge cut into the steep slope. Brown was in great pain through the night suffering from snowblindness.

26 May 1955 – Hardie and Streather
Next morning Hardie and Streather decided a second summit attempt was worthwhile so they set off along the same route but avoiding the previous pair's detour. At the rock wall immediately before the summit Brown and Band had left a sling hanging to help them climb but Hardie and Streather continued further around the base of the wall and found an easy snow slope up to just below the summit which they reached at 12:15.  They spent an hour at the top before descending successfully. Hardie and Streather had carried 2400 litres of oxygen each compared to Band and Brown's 1600 litres but unfortunately a couple of mishaps led to about half of it leaking away and Streather ended up having to descend without supplementary oxygen. They stayed at Camp 6 overnight and next day continued down to Camp 5 to be met by Evans and Dawa Tensing who had been waiting there to support both pairs of climbers attempting the summit.

Departure
Pemi Dorje, one of the Sherpas and Dawa Tenzing's brother-in-law, died at base camp on 26 May. On 19 May he had fallen into a crevasse and become exhausted helping with the carry to Camp 5 and, although he got safely down to base camp and initially appeared to be recovering, he sadly died. As the various parties started to come down the mountain snow and ice were rapidly melting leaving some snow bridges and ladders in an increasingly dangerous state. Evans decided to leave the mountain quickly only taking equipment that could be readily carried and abandoning the rest. By 28 May the expedition had left the mountain.

On the initial march-in, to avoid high passes that might be snowbound, they had left the Singalila Ridge quite far south at Phulat to head down into the jungle of Nepal. On the return march in heavy rain they went up onto the ridge further north, after Ramser, and followed along the crest to avoid leeches infesting the valleys at the time of the monsoon. On 13 June they were back at Darjeeling

Assessment
A day after Norman Hardie and Tony Streather made the second ascent, a coded message was sent back to London announcing their success. The news made headlines around the world, but the expedition never made such an impact as previous ascents such as Everest or K2. In addition, none of the team received national honours at the time. Evans' and Band's publications did not encourage any of the usual nationalist feelings: their reports made no mention of flags placed on the summit.

In a 1956 American Alpine Journal editorial Francis Farquhar said

Over fifty years later Doug Scott, who had climbed Mount Everest and Kangchenjunga, wrote it was

In 2005 Ed Douglas wrote for the British Mountaineering Council: "In 1955 British climbers made the first ascent of Kangchenjunga, a mountain with an even more formidable reputation than Everest. The nation may have forgotten a unique sporting achievement ...".

Right back in 1956 Evans was prescient when he wrote of the Sherpas he so much admired:

Notes

References

Citations

Works cited

Further reading 
 
  and an accompanying article 
 
 
 
 
 

Mountaineering expeditions to the Himalayas
Expeditions from the United Kingdom
Kangchenjunga 1955
1955 in the United Kingdom